Wicky may refer to:

 Kalmia angustifolia (colloquial name: Wicky), a flowering shrub
 Raphaël Wicky (born 1977), retired Swiss footballer
 Edouard Wicky, Swiss racing cyclist
 André Wicky (1928–2016), Swiss former racing driver
 Anton Wicky (born 1940), Ceylon-born educator and celebrity in Japan
 Jean-Claude Wicky (1946–2016), Swiss photographer
 Yanina Wickmayer (nickname: Wicky, born 1989), Belgian tennis player

See also
 Wicki (disambiguation)
 Wiki (disambiguation)